Heungdeoksa temple site, is the site of the historic Heungdeoksa Temple, a Buddhist temple which existed during the Unified Silla and Goryeo periods, in Heungdeok-gu, South Korea.

The temple is believed to have been constructed prior to 848 and was destroyed by fire in the late 1370s. The exact location of Heungdeoksa temple remained unknown until 1985, when a number of relics were discovered as part of a land development project in the area by the Korean Land Development Corporation. The Cheongju University oversaw the archaeological excavation and confirmed it was the location of the Heungdeoksa temple, after discovering a bronze gong and bowl, with the temple's inscription on them. The site was designated as a historic site (No. 315) on May 7, 1986. A reproduction of a Buddhist prayer hall and a three-story stone pagoda have been constructed on the site based on the excavation survey.

The temple was where the Buljojikjisimcheyojoel, the world’s oldest extant book printed with movable metal type, was printed. The book was compiled by the Buddhist monk, Baegun, in 1374, and was printed using movable metal type at the temple in the third year of King Uwang’s reign (1377). This book precedes the publication of the Gutenberg Bible (published in 1455) by 78 years. The book was acquired by Victor Collin de Plancy, the chargé d'affaires with the French Embassy in Seoul in 1887 during the reign of King Gojong and subsequently donated to the Bibliothèque nationale de France, where it currently remains. In 1972, the Buljojikjisimcheyojoel was officially recognised as the world’s oldest printed book and in 2001 it was registered in the UNESCO Memory of the World.

On March 17, 1992 the Cheongju Early Printing Museum was opened adjacent to the heritage site, to promote Korea's historic printing culture.

External links 

 Heungdeoksa Temple Site, Cultural Heritage Administration
 Discovery of Heungdeoksa Temple

References 

Archaeological sites in South Korea
Buddhist temples in South Korea
Demolished buildings and structures in South Korea
Historic Sites of South Korea
Korean pagodas
Buddhist archaeological sites in Korea
Former Buddhist temples
Tourist attractions in North Chungcheong Province
World Heritage Sites in South Korea
Pagodas in South Korea